The Oxford Branch of the Delaware Railroad Company ran from Clayton, Delaware through Henderson, Marydel, Goldsborough, Greenborough, Ridgely, Queen Anne Station, Cordova, Woodland Station, Easton, Llandaff Station, Trappe Station to Oxford, Maryland.  Operations ceased in 1957.

References

External links
NRHS Baltimore Chapter (Facebook Page) 
Oxford and Smyrna Branches; Pennsylvania Railroad Chesapeake Region (Rails and Trails) 

Pennsylvania Railroad lines
Rail infrastructure in Delaware
Rail infrastructure in Maryland

Closed railway lines in the United States